Madan Hipperga is a village in the southern state of Karnataka, India. It is located in the Aland taluk of Kalaburagi district in Karnataka.

Demographics
 India census, Madan Hipparaga had a population of 7,665 with 3,900 males and 3,765 females. It is 75 km from its district Kalaburgi and 28 km from its taluk Aland. It is the biggest village in its taluk.

The surrounding villages and their distances from Madan Hipparga are Nimbal 7.2 km, Hadalgi 8.2 km, Hirolli 13.0 km, Jidaga 14.7 km, Sarasamba 14.9 km, Bhusnur 17.9 km, Dhangapur 17.9 km, Padasavali 21.0 km, Nimbarga 23.9 km, Aland 24.1 km, Rudrawadi 30.0 km, Kadaganchi, Suntnoor, Khajuri, Tadakal, Alanga, Gola. B., Narona, Hodloor, Bhodhan, Belamagi, Chnchansoor, V. K. Salgar, Ambalga and Kamalanagar.

The nearest railway station to Madan Hipparga is Dudhani which is located around 10.8 km away. Other railway stations and their distances from Madan Hipparga are:

Dudhani railway station, 10.8 km.

Boroti railway station, 14.4 km.

Kulali railway station, 15.3 km.

Nagansur railway station, 20.6 km.

Akalkot Road railway station, 25.0 km.

Education Institutes:
Shri Shivalingeshwara Primary and High School, Government Primary and High school, Degree College for Arts, Privately run ITI colleges.
Bank: State Bank Of India, Madan Hipparaga
Hospital: Government Hospital & Private Clinics

Jnana Jyoti (ಜ್ಞಾನ ಜ್ಯೋತಿ) Education Society providing very good education and community service in the region. The society runs a school (Shrana Jyoti school) is a co-educational institution which blossomed in 2008, in the true spirit of Guru. Basaveshwara's teachings, whose vision is to wipe out illiteracy and hence poverty and provide basic educational opportunities to the rural masses.

Jnana Jyoti school rated as the best school in the neighborhood today. Currently, the school has a student strength of ~300 and has 15 trained teachers and support staff. Apart from regional language Kannada, Hindi and English are being taught. The school has both English and Kannada medium instructions. The school is equipped with basic amenities such as toilets, clean drinking water, clean play ground. The School provides transportation both ways to the children living within a 40 km radius, with their two buses.

The school is also involved in community services like conducting periodical workshops, free Eye, dental and medical camps to the villagers annually.

See also
 Gulbarga
 Districts of Karnataka

References

External links
 http://Gulbarga.nic.in/

Villages in Kalaburagi district